Istayl Naton is a Philippine television lifestyle magazine show broadcast by GMA Iloilo.

It aims to bring the Ilonggo culture and way of life closer to its Ilonggo viewers. The show is hosted by actor John Arceo, Dino Vasquez and Angelia Ong with Mama Monyeka as segment host.

References

GMA Network original programming
Philippine television shows
Television in Iloilo City